Thomas Palm is a German lightweight rower. He won a gold medal at the 1987 World Rowing Championships in Copenhagen with the lightweight men's four.

References

Year of birth missing (living people)
Living people
German male rowers
World Rowing Championships medalists for West Germany